Evens Joseph (born 16 July 1999) is a French professional footballer who plays as a forward for French club Lille reserve team.

Club career
On 22 November 2017, Joseph signed his first professional contract with Caen. Joseph made his professional debut for Caen in a 1-0 Ligue 1 loss to Monaco on 24 November 2018.

On 31 January 2020, Joseph signed on loan with Championnat National side Boulogne for the remainder of the 2019–20 season. He rejoined Boulogne for a second loan spell on 13 August 2020, for the 2020–21 season, with an option to buy.

On 4 February 2022, Joseph signed with Sète.

Personal life
Born in France, Joseph is of Martiniquais descent.

References

External links
 
 SM Caen Profile

1999 births
Living people
People from Neuilly-sur-Marne
French footballers
France youth international footballers
French people of Martiniquais descent
Association football forwards
Stade Malherbe Caen players
US Boulogne players
FC Sète 34 players
Ligue 1 players
Ligue 2 players
Championnat National players
Championnat National 2 players
Footballers from Seine-Saint-Denis